Better Call Saul Presents: Slippin' Jimmy, more commonly known as Slippin' Jimmy, is an American animated streaming series and a spin-off of Better Call Saul (itself a spin-off of Breaking Bad). The series follows a young Jimmy McGill's misadventures in Cicero with his best friend Marco Pasternak. The show's release on AMC+ was set to coincide with the release of the final episode of the first half of Better Call Saul'''s sixth season. Upon release the show was universally panned by both critics and audiences for its poor writing and animation, and its completely different tone to the rest of the franchise.

 Production 
 Development Variety reported in March 2021 that AMC was developing an animated spinoff series of Better Call Saul, titled Slippin' Jimmy. The series, a prequel based on younger Jimmy and Chuck's time in Cicero, Illinois, was developed by Ariel Levine and Kathleen Williams-Foshee, who previously worked on the associated live-action web series. Voice actors include Chi McBride, Laraine Newman, and Sean Giambrone as Jimmy.Slippin' Jimmy was later revealed as a short-form series on February 10, 2022, along with the next season of the Better Call Saul Employee Training Video series and Cooper's Bar starring Rhea Seehorn. Told in the style of classic 1970s-era cartoons, each episode is an ode to a specific movie genre — from Spaghetti Westerns and Buster Keaton to The Exorcist. The series was produced by Rick and Morty animators Starburns and written by Levine and Williams-Foshee.

 Release 
The first teaser clip was released on February 10, 2022, when the series was officially unveiled. A release date was announced to occur during the sixth season of Better Call Saul. All six episodes of Slippin' Jimmy were released on May 23, 2022, on AMC+ to coincide with the release of Better Call Sauls mid-season six finale "Plan and Execution".

Cast
Starring
 Sean Giambrone as Jimmy McGill
 Kyle S. More as Marco Pasternak
 Will Vought as Trent Titweiler

Recurring
 Beth Grant as Ms. Retch & Mrs. Brockfrater
 Jasmine Gatewood as Bobbi & Sue
 Chi McBride as Father Karras
 Gideon Adlon as Dawn Marie
 Gary Anthony Williams as Demon
 Laraine Newman as Sister Beth
 Carlos Alazraqui as Cheech & Comic Store Worker
 Brian Sommer as Radio Host & Taxi Driver
 Zac Palladino as Trent's Mom
 David Herman (additional voices)

Episodes

 Reception 
The series received negative reviews from fans and critics alike. Alex Ashbrook from Comic Book Resources said the series is "crudely drawn and seems to have been hastily put together compared to how beautifully crafted its predecessors were. Despite Peter Gould appearing as an executive director, his skills are nowhere to be found." Mark Donaldson from Screen Rant criticized the concept, saying "the animated spinoff is being sold as a digital exclusive but this race to provide sellable content to audiences undermines storytelling ... the team behind both Breaking Bad and Better Call Saul have proven themselves to be savvy storytellers that respect the journeys of their characters over cheap cash-ins. It's this integrity that makes Slippin Jimmy'' feel like such a misstep."

References

External links 
 

Better Call Saul
2022 animated television series debuts
2020s American adult animated television series
2022 American television series debuts
American adult animated comedy television series
American adult animated television spin-offs
American flash adult animated television series
English-language television shows